Seven Dials is a district surrounding a  major road junction of the same name in Brighton, in the city of Brighton and Hove.  It is located on high ground just northwest of Brighton railway station, south of the Prestonville area, and approximately ¾ mile north of the seafront.

The name refers to the seven roads which radiate outwards from the roundabout-controlled junction, and is derived from a seven-way junction in London featuring a monument with six sundials.  The roundabout itself, constructed in 1925 is notable as an early example of this type of road junction in the UK, and preceded the installation of semaphore signals in Brighton in 1927.

Location
In central Brighton, where seven roads meet; clockwise from the north, these are:
Prestonville Road
Chatham Place, (B2122) leading to New England Road and Preston Circus - another major road junction
Buckingham Place, (A2010) leading to the railway station by way of a sharply curving downhill slope
Dyke Road,(A2121) one of the city's main roads - leading to the city centre
Vernon Terrace,(B2122) leading to Montpelier Road and the seafront
Goldsmid Road,(sic) (B2020) leading into Davigdor Road and Cromwell Road into Hove
The northward continuation of Dyke Road, (A2010) leading eventually to the Devil's Dyke beauty spot on the South Downs

Development
The area began to be developed with a mixture of terraced houses and more substantial Victorian villas shortly after the London and Brighton Railway opened sections of its lines in the area.  The route westwards to Shoreham-by-Sea (opened in 1840) ran through the area, while the Brighton Main Line (1841) and the throat of Brighton station lie on the eastern edge.

A 2013 revamp of the junction is intended to improve its appearance, make it safer for cyclists, and easier for pedestrians. There was some disagreement during the public consultation phase beforehand. A campaign to prevent the removal of an elm tree from the top of Vernon Terrace – with protesters camping in the tree — was successful, with works being changed to keep it.

Gallery

References

External links
 

Areas of Brighton and Hove